() is a word used 74 times in the Hebrew Bible. Its etymology and precise meaning are unknown, though various interpretations are given.

It is probably either a liturgical-musical mark or an instruction on the reading of the text, with the meaning of "stop and listen." Another proposal is that  can be used to indicate that there is to be a musical interlude at that point in the Psalm. It can also be interpreted as a form of underlining in preparation for the next paragraph.

It should not be confused with the Hebrew word  meaning "rock".

Occurrences
This word occurs 71 times in 39 of the Psalms, and three times in Habakkuk 3: altogether 74 times in the Bible. It is found at the end of Psalms 3, 24, and 46, and in most other cases at the end of a verse, the exceptions being Psalms 55:19, 57:3, and Habakkuk 3:3, 9, 13.

At least some of the Psalms were sung accompanied by musical instruments and there are references to this in many chapters. Thirty-one of the thirty-nine psalms with the caption "To the choir-master" include the word .

Interpretations

Historical
The significance of this term was apparently not known even by ancient Biblical commentators. This can be seen by the variety of renderings given to it. Aquila, Jerome, and the Targum translate it as "always", and in Jewish liturgy the word is used to mean "forever" (notably in the second to last blessing of the Amidah).

According to Hippolytus, the Greek term  signified a change in rhythm or melody at the places marked by the term, or a change in thought and theme. Against this explanation, Baethgen notes that  also occurs at the end of some psalms.

Modern (1900s)

Imperative: "lift up", "exalt"; pause
One proposed meaning assigns it to the root , as an imperative that should properly have been vocalized , . The meaning of this imperative is given as "lift up," equivalent to "loud" or "fortissimo," a direction to the accompanying musicians to break in at the place marked with crash of cymbals and blare of trumpets, the orchestra playing an interlude while the singers' voices were hushed. The effect, as far as the singer was concerned, was to mark a pause. Similarly, another opinion understands  being held to be a variant of the verb  (meaning "pause").

The Brown-Driver-Briggs Hebrew and English Lexicon (2006) states that the main derivation of the Hebrew word  is found through the fientive verb root  which means "to lift up (voices)" or "to exalt," and also carries a close connotational relationship to the verb , which is similar in meaning: "to lift up" or "to cast up." The word , which shifts the accent back to the last syllable of the verb form, indicates that in this context, the verb is being used in the imperative mood as somewhat of a directive to the reader. As such, perhaps the most instructive way to view the use of this word, particularly in the context of the Psalms, would be as the writer's instruction to the reader to pause and exalt the Lord.

Marker between paragraphs or of a quotation
Heinrich Grätz argues that  introduces a new paragraph, and also in some cases a quotation (e.g., Psalms 57:8-12 from 108:2-6). The fact that the term occurs four times at the end of a Psalm would not weigh against this theory. The Psalms were meant to be read in sequence, and, moreover, many of them are fragments; indeed, Psalms 9 and 10 are considered one psalm in the Septuagint; the Septuagint also omits the word  ("pause") at the end of Psalms 3, 24, 46 and 68.

B. Jacob concludes (1) that since no etymological explanation is possible,  signifies a pause in or for the Temple song; and (2) that its meaning was concealed lest the Temple privileges should be obtained by the synagogues or perhaps even by the churches.

Other proposals
Another interpretation claims that  comes from the primary Hebrew root word , meaning "to hang," and by implication "to measure (weigh)".

Philosophy
The term  is used by the Czech philosopher John Amos Comenius (1592–1670) at the end of his book . Likewise,  appears several times in the Wanderer and Shadow's song in Among the Daughters of the Desert from Nietzsche's Thus Spoke Zarathustra. Eliphas Levi (1810–1875), in his work "Transcendental Magic", says "Selah! Fiat! So mote it be!" at the end of one of his magical invocations of the elemental spirits.

Rastafari usage
 is used in Iyaric Rastafarian vocabulary. It can be heard at the end of spoken-word segments of some reggae songs. Its usage here, again, is to accentuate the magnitude and importance of what has been said, and often is a sort of substitute for amen. Notable, according to Rastafarian faith, is also the word's similarity with the incarnated god and savior Selassie (Ethiopia's former emperor Haile Selassie).

Art and popular culture

Film and television
 In Predator 2, just before being killed by the predator, the Jamaican drug lord King Willie says, "His foundation lie in the holy mountain" before pausing and adding "Selah".
 In the 1975 John Huston film The Man Who Would Be King, Daniel Dravot (Sean Connery) punctuates his royal proclamations with "selah."
 Selah was defined to mean 'pause and consider' in Babylon 5 episode "Deconstruction of Falling Stars."

Games
 The variation "seyla" is used in Battletech as a ritual response during Clan ceremonies.

Journalism
 Gonzo journalist Hunter S. Thompson commonly used the word to end articles and personal letters. In Hunter S. Thompson's collected works "Songs of the Doomed," "The Proud Highway: Saga of A Desperate Southern Gentleman 1955-1967," and Fear and Loathing in America: the Brutal Odyssey of an Outlaw Journalist, The Gonzo Letters Volume Two 1968-1976 the word Selah is used frequently in letters and diatribes written from the 1960s to the 1990s. The word is used similarly to the word allora in Italy.
 Furman Bisher, the former sports editor and columnist for The Atlanta Journal-Constitution, for decades signed off his columns with "Selah."
 The word is used often by political columnist and blogger Ed Kilgore at the close of a day's postings.

Literature
 "Selah!" is used at the end of the second part (titled Dimanche) of Conversations dans le Loir-et-Cher by French writer Paul Claudel (1935).
The writer Robert Ruark used the word 'Selah' to finish an educational exclamation by the Old Man in the second chapter of his book 'The Old Man's Boy Grows Older'.
 Journalist, author and screenwriter George MacDonald Fraser used selah occasionally in The Flashman Papers, a celebrated historical fiction series published between 1969 and 2005.
 Selah is the last word in Anita Diamant's book The Red Tent and in Edward Dahlberg's Because I Was Flesh, and according to Charlotte Chandler also the last word Groucho Marx chose for the extensive biographical work she did with him. 
 Katherine Kurtz uses it in some of her Deryni novels, including The King's Justice (1985); it is among the acquired Eastern influences on the ritual practices of Deryni at King Kelson's court, largely brought by Richenda, Duchess of Corwyn, after her marriage to Duke Alaric Morgan. It is also the last word in Gilbert Sorrentino's novel Little Casino (2002), probably in homage to Dahlberg. 
 In poet Julia Vinograd's American Book Award-winning collection of poems, "The Book of Jerusalem", each poem is followed by "selah".
 In the humorous essay "New Days in Old Bottles," by Robert Benchley, the narrator ends with the paragraph "Life and the Theatre. Who knows? Selah."
 Selah! appears in the final stanza of Geoffrey Hill's poem "History as Poetry": 'The old / Laurels wagging with the new: Selah!'
 Amen! Selah! ends pronouncements in several stories of Sholem Aleichem, such as Dreyfus in Kasrilevka and Modern Children

Characters named Selah
Characters named Selah appear in:
 George Elliot Clarke's long narrative poem Whylah Falls
 Shane Jones's first novel Light Boxes
 Charlaine Harris's novel Dead as a Doornail
 Virginia Hamilton's novel The House of Dies Drear
 Dionne Brand’s novel Theory 
 Madeleine L'Engle's novel Many Waters

Music
 During a Jimmy Kimmel Live performance, U2 frontman Bono announced "Take you to church, Selah," right before the choir started singing.
 "Selah" is the name of the second track on the 2019 album Jesus Is King by Kanye West, which West defined as a term meaning "to look back and reflect upon". According to BibleGateway.com, the title is a reference to Psalm 57:6 of the Bible.
 "Selah" is the name of a song by R&B/Hip-Hop artist Lauryn Hill.
 "Selah" is the title of a miniature for trio (flute, clarinet and piano) by Argentinean composer Juan Maria Solare.

Visual arts
 "Selah" is the name of both a sculpture and a 2017 exhibition by artist Sanford Biggers.

Institutions named Selah
 The Selah Workshop of the Israel Center for Jewish-Christian Relations, Galilee, Israel 
 Selah: The Israel Crisis Management Center, helps "immigrants [to Israel] struggling with tragedy"

See also
 Jewish prayer
 List of Jewish prayers and blessings
 Salah (Muslim prayer)
 Selah (band)
  Selah, Washington (a US city)
 Selah (biblical figure)
 Saleh (prophet)
 Saleh (given name)

References

Bibliography
 

Hebrew words and phrases
Jewish prayer and ritual texts
Psalms
Words and phrases with no direct English translation
Hebrew words and phrases in Jewish prayers and blessings